The 1972 Wyoming Cowboys football team represented the University of Wyoming as a member of the Western Athletic Conference (WAC) during the 1972 NCAA University Division football season. Led by second-year head coach Fritz Shurmur, the Cowboys compiled a record of 4–7 overall and 3–4 in conference play, placing fifth in the WAC. The team played home games on campus at War Memorial Stadium in Laramie, Wyoming.

Schedule

References

Wyoming
Wyoming Cowboys football seasons
Wyoming Cowboys football